is a  mountain in Azumino, Nagano Prefecture, Japan. It is situated in Japan's Hida Mountains in Nagano Prefecture.
It was specified for Chūbu-Sangaku National Park on December 4, 1934.
Granite forms the unique body with white sands and sharp rocks exposed at the top. Kassen One (ridge) is a steep trail challenging to climbers ascending from Nakabusa Hot Springs.

Mountain hut 
The mountain climbing trail between Mount Tsubakuro and Mount Yari is called  owing to its extensive use over time. It has two mountain huts along the way.
 is near the summit and is one of the oldest mountain huts in Japan, completed in 1921.

Geography

Nearby mountains 
The following are the main mountains in the surrounding area:

Rivers 
The rivers flowing on the slopes of Mount Tsubakuro are mountain streams flowing towards the Shinano River basin. The Nakabusa River rises on the eastern side and tributaries of the upper stream of the Takase River rise on the western slopes.

Gallery

View from Mount Tsubakuro

Scenery of Mount Tsubakuro

References

See also 

 Chūbu-Sangaku National Park
 Hida Mountains
 List of mountains in Japan

Hida Mountains
Mountains of Nagano Prefecture